Victoria, sometimes known as Bandar Labuan, is the capital of the Federal Territory of Labuan in Malaysia, an island group off the north coast of Borneo. It is in the southeast corner of Labuan and its Malay name, Bandar Victoria, is commonly used to honour the reign of Queen Victoria. The town is an urban district within the wider city limits of Victoria which includes Labuan Port, a sheltered deep-water harbour which is an important trans-shipment point for Brunei Darussalam, northern Sarawak and western Sabah.

History

Since the 15th century, the town area including other parts of Labuan were under the Bruneian Empire. Its history dates back to the time when the island was ceded by Sultan Omar Ali Saifuddin II to the British. Rodney Mundy, a British naval officer, later visited the island in the name of Queen Victoria. The island was then occupied by Japan from 3 January 1942 until June 1945 and governed as part of the Northern Borneo military unit by the Japanese 37th Army. During the Battle of Labuan it was liberated by the 9th Division of Australian Imperial Force on 10 June 1945 and placed under a British Military Administration until 15 July 1946, when it was incorporated into the North Borneo Crown Colony. During this time, the Crown Colony government re-established much of the infrastructure that had been destroyed during the war. The island later became part of the state of Sabah and Malaysia in 1963 before the state government of Sabah ceded the island to the federal government in 1984. It was declared an international offshore financial centre and free trade zone in 1990 to assist the development of Victoria.

Economy

The major products produced on Labuan and exported through Labuan Port include copra, rubber and sago. The port is on a natural deep-water bay where large vessels can anchor as it is sheltered from typhoons. Vessels received include containers, bulk, and general cargoes. The main jetty is 244 metres long with an alongside depth of 8.5 metres and it can accommodate vessels to 16,000 DWT. The wharf has four berths. There are about 15,600 m² available in open storage, two warehouses and a container yard. A 10,000 m² yard and warehouses are available outside the port. Its capacity is 100,000 TEUs of containerised cargo per annum. Five private jetties are installed: the Shell Jetty that specialises in petroleum; the Iron Ore Jetty; the Methanol Jetty; and two offshore wheat and maize jetties called the Asian Supply Base Jetty and the Sabah Flour Mill Jetty.

Victoria's Financial Park along Jalan Merdeka houses offshore teams of international banks, insurance and trust companies. Victoria is an offshore support hub for deepwater oil and gas activities in the region. In 2012, Victoria had a population of over 85,000 with nearly half of those coming from elsewhere in Malaysia and from Brunei Darussalam. It has a 1,500-seat convention hall adjoining a large shopping mall; these form a modern complex which enhances Victoria's status among International Offshore Financial Centres.

Climate
Victoria, Labuan features a tropical rainforest climate (Af), which is true for virtually all of Malaysia due to its close proximity to the equator, with constantly high temperatures and abundant rainfall over the course of the year.

International relations

Sister city
Victoria currently has one sister city:

References

Labuan